JMac may refer to:

Jamie Maclaren
Jesse McCartney
John F. MacArthur
J Mac